Xavier Woodson-Luster (born August 6, 1995) is an American football linebacker who plays for the Fundidores de Monterrey of the Liga de Fútbol Americano Profesional (LFA). He played college football at Arkansas State. Woodson-Luster has also been a member of the Oakland Raiders, Buffalo Bills, Cleveland Browns and Houston Texans.

Professional career

Oakland Raiders
Woodson-Luster signed with the Oakland Raiders as an undrafted free agent on May 5, 2017. He was waived on September 2, 2017, but was re-signed on September 5. He was waived by the Raiders on December 20, 2017.

Buffalo Bills
On December 26, 2017, Woodson-Luster was signed to the Buffalo Bills' practice squad. He signed a reserve/future contract with the Bills on January 10, 2018. On September 1, 2018, Woodson-Luster was waived by the Bills.

Cleveland Browns
Woodson-Luster was signed to the Cleveland Browns' practice squad on October 13, 2018. He was promoted to the active roster on October 16, 2018. He was waived on October 25, 2018 and re-signed to the practice squad five days later. He was promoted back to the active roster on December 13, 2018. He was waived on May 6, 2019.

Houston Texans
On May 13, 2019, Woodson-Luster signed with the Houston Texans. On August 31, 2019, Woodson-Luster was waived/injured by the Texans and placed on injured reserve. He was waived from injured reserve on October 7, 2019.

Ottawa Redblacks 
On May 11, 2022, Woodson-Luster signed with the Ottawa Redblacks of the Canadian Football League (CFL).

Fundidores de Monterrey 
In February 2023, Woodson-Luster signed with the Fundidores de Monterrey of the Liga de Fútbol Americano Profesional (LFA).

References

External links
Arkansas State Red Wolves bio

1995 births
Living people
People from Eufaula, Alabama
Players of American football from Alabama
American football linebackers
Arkansas State Red Wolves football players
Oakland Raiders players
Buffalo Bills players
Cleveland Browns players
Houston Texans players
Fundidores de Monterrey players
American expatriate players of American football
American expatriate sportspeople in Mexico